Irina (Inna) Mozhevitina (born July 22, 1985 in Ridder, Kazakhstan) is a Kazakh biathlete.

References

External links
 

1985 births
Living people
People from Ridder, Kazakhstan
Kazakhstani female biathletes
Asian Games medalists in biathlon
Biathletes at the 2003 Asian Winter Games
Biathletes at the 2007 Asian Winter Games
Biathletes at the 2011 Asian Winter Games
Asian Games gold medalists for Kazakhstan
Asian Games silver medalists for Kazakhstan
Asian Games bronze medalists for Kazakhstan
Medalists at the 2003 Asian Winter Games
Medalists at the 2007 Asian Winter Games
Medalists at the 2011 Asian Winter Games
21st-century Kazakhstani women